Ren Jiyu (born April 15, 1916 - died July 11, 2009) in Pingyuan County, Shandong Province was a philosopher, scholar in religious studies, historian, member of the Chinese Communist Party, and honorary director of the National Library of China. He died at 4:30 on July 11, 2009, in Beijing, at the age of 93.

Main Works

 Collection of Buddhist Thinking during the Han and Tang Dynasties, 1963
 A History of Chinese Philosophy (ed.), 4 vols., 1963
 A brief History of Chinese Philosophy, 1973
 History of the Development of Chinese Philosophy, 1983
 Chinese Daoist Philosophers, 1990
 Mozi and Mohist, 1994, reprinted 2009

References
 

1916 births
People's Republic of China philosophers
Chinese librarians
History of Buddhism in China
2009 deaths
Victims of the Cultural Revolution
Writers from Dezhou
People's Republic of China historians
Historians from Shandong
Philosophers from Shandong
National University of Peking alumni